is a Japanese manga series written and illustrated by Tsukumizu. It was serialized monthly through Shinchosha's Kurage Bunch manga website from February 2014 to January 2018 and collected in six tankōbon volumes. An English release of the manga is licensed in North America by Yen Press.

A 12-episode anime television adaptation produced by White Fox, mainly covering the manga's first four volumes, aired in Japan from October to December 2017.

In 2019, Girls' Last Tour won the 50th Seiun Award for Best Comic category.

Plot
The series follows two girls, Yuuri and Chito, as they navigate the ruins of civilization after an unknown apocalypse. As they travel in their Kettenkrad, they seek food and supplies while surviving day-to-day, sometimes encountering other survivors during their journey.

Characters

One of the two main protagonists, nicknamed "Chii-chan". She has a wide knowledge of machines and drives the Kettenkrad. She is literate and an avid reader. She is generally calm and composed, but can be riled by Yuuri on occasion.

The other protagonist, nicknamed "Yuu". She is more easy-going than Chito, and cannot read, but is proficient with rifles and is a crack shot. She rides in the back of the Kettenkrad. Yuuri has little fear of the unknown and is quite adventurous. She is driven by her personal desires such as often wanting to eat more food than they have.

A traveler Chito and Yuuri meet while trying to find a path to the upper stratum of the city. He is a cartographer who wants to map the entire city. He gifts his camera to Yuuri and Chito when he leaves them to continue his mapping project.

A scientist who lives in an abandoned airbase who is building an airplane based on old records so that she can fly to another city. She helps fix Chito and Yuuri's Kettenkrad and enlists their help to finish the airplane. She gives Yuuri and Chito potatoes and tells them where to find more.

Named Ket in the English manga translation. A mysterious small creature that is long and white, resembling a cat which Chito and Yuuri pick up on their journey. It communicates with the girls via radio signals. Nuko can shape-shift to activate mechanisms and likes eating bullets. It is later revealed to be part of a species which consumes weapons and power sources to stabilize them. After being discovered by more of its own kind, it leaves with them.

Media

Manga
Girls' Last Tour was written and illustrated by Tsukumizu and serialized in Shinchosha's Kurage Bunch online magazine between February 21, 2014, and January 12, 2018, and collected in six volumes. Yen Press released the series in North America. A manga anthology illustrated by various artists was released on October 13, 2017.

Anime
An anime television series adaptation by White Fox was announced by Kadokawa at Anime Expo 2017, with Takaharu Ozaki as director, Kazuyuki Fudeyasu in charge of series composition, and Mai Toda adapting the character designs for animation. The series aired in Japan between October 6 and December 22, 2017, on AT-X and other stations. The voice actresses of the protagonists, Inori Minase and Yurika Kubo, perform the opening and ending themes,  and "More One Night". Sentai Filmworks have licensed the series and streamed the series on Anime Strike. MVM Films has licensed the series in the UK. Muse Communication has licensed the series in Asia-Pacific.
Each episode consists of two to three short interconnecting stories.

Reception

Manga
Girls' Last Tour won the 50th Seiun Award for Best Comic category in 2019. The English release of the first two volumes were included on the American Library Association's list of 2018 Great Graphic Novels for Teens.

Anime
The anime series won the "Best Slice of Life" category in the 2nd Crunchyroll Anime Awards in 2018. IGN also listed Girls' Last Tour as one of the best anime of the 2010s, describing it as a "morose anime" which is "made brighter through [Chito and Yuuri's] perspective on a barren world".

Notes

References

External links
 
 

Manga series
2014 manga
2017 anime television series debuts
Anime series based on manga
Anime Strike
Crunchyroll Anime Awards winners
Iyashikei anime and manga
Manga adapted into television series
Muse Communication
Post-apocalyptic anime and manga
Science fiction anime and manga
Seinen manga
Sentai Filmworks
Shinchosha manga
White Fox
Yen Press titles